Raniele Almeida Melo (born 31 December 1996), simply known as Raniele, is a Brazilian footballer who plays as either a central defender or a defensive midfielder for Avaí.

Club career
Born in Baixa Grande, Bahia, Raniele played for Fernandópolis' under-20 squad before finishing his formation with Ferroviária. He made his senior debut with the latter on 10 July 2016, starting in a 0–0 Copa Paulista away draw against Rio Claro.

Raniele helped AFE to win the 2017 Copa Paulista, but was loaned to Taubaté on 4 December 2017. He again reached the finals of the Copa Paulista with Ferroviária in 2018, before moving to Penapolense on loan for the 2019 Campeonato Paulista Série A2.

Back at Ferroviária for the 2019 Série D, Raniele renewed his contract until 2022 with the club but moved to Portuguesa on loan on 25 November 2019. He was a starter at Lusa before moving to Jacuipense of the Série C on 16 July 2020.

On 7 December 2020, while owned by Jacuipense, Raniele signed for Botafogo-SP for the remainder of the 2020 Série B. The following 10 February, he moved to Série A side Bahia, initially for the under-23 squad.

Career statistics

Honours
Ferroviária
Copa Paulista: 2017

Bahia
Copa do Nordeste: 2021

References

External links

1996 births
Living people
Brazilian footballers
Sportspeople from Bahia
Association football defenders
Campeonato Brasileiro Série A players
Campeonato Brasileiro Série B players
Campeonato Brasileiro Série C players
Campeonato Brasileiro Série D players
Associação Ferroviária de Esportes players
Esporte Clube Taubaté players
Clube Atlético Penapolense players
Associação Portuguesa de Desportos players
Esporte Clube Jacuipense players
Botafogo Futebol Clube (SP) players
Esporte Clube Bahia players
Avaí FC players